"Stand by You" is a song by American singer and songwriter Rachel Platten. It was released as the second single from Platten's major label debut studio album, Wildfire (2016). The song was released on September 11, 2015, by Columbia Records. The song peaked at number 37 on the Billboard Hot 100, making it her second consecutive top-40 song. "Stand by You" reached the top of the Adult Top 40 chart in February 2016.

On October 5, 2016, Platten released the lyric video for a Spanish version of the song entitled "Siempre Estaré Ahí" (Spanish for "Always Be There"), featuring Argentine singer Diego Torres.

Composition 
According to the sheet music published at Musicnotes.com by Sony/ATV Songs LLC, "Stand by You" is written in the key of A major with a moderate tempo of 94 beats per minute.  The song follows a chord progression of A – D – E, and Platten's vocals span from E3 to F5.

Critical reception
The song received critical acclaim. Mike Wass of Idolator said it is a “mood-lifting anthem”. Jason Scott of Popdust stated “Instead of projecting the message onto herself and her own journey, [...] she etches out a storyline of hope as she reaches out to her fellow underdog. Platten, who is a testament that age (sometimes) is no boundary to pop, then climbs higher on the monumental chorus. Her vocals are markedly more confident, too, exuding wisdom (and adorned with unfettered coolness). 'I’m gonna stand by you. Even if we’re breaking down, we can find a way to break through,' rings the resounding hook, an interplay between her career-defining moment and those severely aching for one." He also claimed, "The larger-than-life narrative is charming and only furthers the singer’s worthiness of being heard."

Music video
On November 6, 2015, the official music video for the song was released to YouTube. It was directed by Hannah Lux Davis.

Track listing
CD single and digital download
"Stand by You" – 3:39

Other versions
 Dave Aude Extended Mix – 4:27
 Dave Aude 100 Remix – 3:24
 Dave Aude Instrumental – 3:24
 DJ Mike D Mixshow Mix – 3:52
 DJ Mike D Radio Edit – 3:23
 Acoustic – 3:53

Charts and certifications

Weekly charts

Year-end charts

Certifications

References

2015 singles
2015 songs
Rachel Platten songs
Columbia Records singles
Music videos directed by Hannah Lux Davis
Songs written by Jack Antonoff
Songs written by Joy Williams (singer)
Songs written by Jon Levine